Sypir Jean-Victor Traoré (born 20 June 1985) is a Burkinabé professional basketball player for Lille Métropole BC of the LNB Pro B in France.

Professional career
In June 2019, Traoré returned to Lille Métropole BC, where he played from 2014–2017. He re-signed with the team on June 30, 2021.

National team
Traoré played for Burkina Faso’s national basketball team in 2012 and 2013.

References

External links
Eurobasket.com profile 
RealGM.com profile

1985 births
Living people
Burkinabé men's basketball players
Burkinabé people of Senegalese descent
Power forwards (basketball)
Basketball players from Dakar
Burkinabé expatriate sportspeople in France
21st-century Burkinabé people